Austria competed at the 1932 Summer Olympics in Los Angeles, United States.  The team ranked eighteenth overall and attained 5 medals. 19 competitors, 17 men and 2 women, took part in 14 events in 7 sports.

Medalists

Athletics

Diving

Fencing

One fencer, Ellen Müller-Preis, represented Austria at the 1932 Summer Olympics. She won gold in the women's foil event.
Women's foil
 Ellen Müller-Preis

Sailing

Open

Weightlifting

Wrestling

Art competitions

References

External links
Official Olympic Reports
International Olympic Committee results database

Nations at the 1932 Summer Olympics
1932
1932 in Austrian sport